Murr may refer to:

Geography
 Murr (river), a river in Baden-Württemberg, Germany
 Murr, Baden-Württemberg, a municipality in the district of Ludwigsburg, Baden-Württemberg, Germany
 Rems-Murr-Kreis, a district (Kreis) in Baden-Württemberg, Germany
 MU-RR, ISO 3166-2 code of the Rivière du Rempart District, Mauritius

Fiction
 representation of the purring sound of felids, e.g. in comics
 Tomcat Murr, protagonist of the novel The Life and Opinions of the Tomcat Murr, written by E. T. A. Hoffmann
 Tomcat Murr, character in the books about the adventures of hedgehog Mecki, mascot of the German television magazine Hörzu

Economy
 Murr Television, marketed and widely known as MTV Lebanon, a Lebanese television station

Science
 MURR, nuclear research reactor at the University of Missouri in Columbia, Missouri

People with the surname
 Andrew Murr, member of the Texas House of Representatives from Kimble County
 Charles T. Murr, Roman Catholic priest and author
 Christoph Gottlieb von Murr (1733–1811), polymathic German scholar
 Elias Murr, born 1962, Lebanese politician, son of Michel Murr
 Gabriel Murr, Lebanese politician
 Heinz Murr (1919–1998), Hauptsturmführer in the Waffen SS during World War II
 James "Murr" Murray (born 1976), American comedian, television star and member of The Tenderloins
 Josef Murr (1864–1932), Austrian philologist and botanist
 May Murr (1929–2008), Lebanese historian, writer, poet, and political activist, sister of Michel Murr
 Michel Murr (1932–2021), Lebanese politician and businessman, father of Elias Murr, brother of May Murr
 Mohammad Al Murr, born 1960, Dubai short-story writer
 Naeem Murr, born 1965, British-Lebanese novelist
 Wilhelm Murr (1888–1945), German Nazi politician

See also
 Myrrh
 Murre

Arabic-language surnames